Jorge Carlos Dortas Olivieri, also commonly known simply as Jorge Olivieri (9 August 1931 – 8 September 1966) was a Brazilian basketball player. He competed in the men's tournament at the 1956 Summer Olympics.

References

External links
 

1931 births
1966 deaths
Brazilian men's basketball players
Olympic basketball players of Brazil
Basketball players at the 1956 Summer Olympics
Place of birth missing